E001 may refer to:

 E001 series, a Japanese cruise train branded Train Suite Shiki-shima
 European route E001